The 1998 Limerick Senior Hurling Championship was the 104th staging of the Limerick Senior Hurling Championship since its establishment by the Limerick County Board.

Patrickswell were the defending champions.

On 20 September 1998, Ahane won the championship after a 1-11 to 0-09 defeat of Patrickswell in the final. It was their 17th championship title overall and their first title since 1955.

Results

Final

Championship statistics

Miscellaneous

 Ahane end an 43 year gap to win the first time since 1955.

References

Limerick Senior Hurling Championship
Limerick Senior Hurling Championship